The Whitehead Mark 3 torpedo was a Whitehead torpedo adopted by the United States Navy for use in an anti-surface ship role after the E. W. Bliss Company of Brooklyn, New York secured manufacturing rights in 1892.

The primary difference between the Mark 3 and the previous versions of the 3.55-meter Whiteheads was the inclusion of the Obry steering gyro for azimuth control. This device reduced the maximum deviation right or left of the target from 24 to 8 yards. About 100 Mark 3s were purchased from the E. W. Bliss Company; in 1913, these were redesignated Torpedo Type A. They were used on submarines of the A, B, C and D classes.  These were withdrawn from service use in 1922 when all torpedoes designed before the Bliss-Leavitt Mark 7 torpedo were condemned.

Characteristics

The Mark 3 was ordinarily assembled into three sections: the warhead, the air flask and the after-body. The warhead's charge of wet guncotton weighed 118 pounds. The Mark 3 was what was known as a "cold-running" torpedo. The three-cylinder engine ran on cold, compressed air which was stored in the air flask. The after-body carried the engine and the tail, which contained the propellers.

The Mark 3 was launched from battleships and torpedo boats.

See also
American 18 inch torpedo

References

Torpedoes
Torpedoes of the United States
Unmanned underwater vehicles
Whitehead torpedoes